The 2017–18 FC Red Bull Salzburg season was the 85th season in club history. They were defending League and Cup champions.

Squad

Out on loan

Kits

Transfers

In

Out

Loans in

Loans out

Competitions

Bundesliga

League table

Results summary

Results by round

Results

Austrian Cup

UEFA Champions League

Qualifying rounds

UEFA Europa League

Qualifying rounds

Group stage

Knockout phase

Statistics

Appearances and goals

|-
|colspan="14"|Players also registered for Liefering :
|-
|colspan="14"|Players away on loan :

|-
|colspan="14"|Players who left Red Bull Salzburg during the season:

|}

Goal scorers

Clean sheets

Disciplinary Record

References

FC Red Bull Salzburg seasons
Red Bull Salzburg
Red Bull Salzburg
Austrian football championship-winning seasons